Celeste Mitzi Karin Matthews (born 1961) is a South African actress, playwright, and City of Cape Town local government official elected to the City Council in 2021. She is best known for her roles as Gertie Cupido in kykNET & kie's Arendsvlei (a telenovela) and Auntie Hester in David Kramer and Taliep Petersen's award-winning 2002 revival of District Six – The Musical (1987). Vincent Colby of the District Six Museum cites the musical play as the material which steered a pivotal discussion held in 1994 at the 'old church hall' in former District Six to establish a dedicated museum.

Personal life & education 
Matthews was born in Klavier Laan (lit. "piano lane"), Steenberg to Anthony Alexander Matthews, a public servant, and Lorraine Ruby Gordene Mentoor. Her childhood home was opposite the Rahmaniyah Masjied (Steenberg Mosque). Matthews’ ethnic background is matrilineally Batswana and Khoekhoen — descending directly from the ‘controversial’ 18th century slave, Mento(o)r van Mozambique (1792) of Quelimane at Oudebosch. According to the Matthews family's oral history, her father's family are of Bantu, St. Helenian, and early Afro-American extraction.

She matriculated from Rosebank's Progress College in 1992, whereafter she obtained her Teaching Diploma from Hewat Teachers Training College (1996); followed by an Advanced Certificate in Education (ACE) with a major in Science from the University of Cape Town (2003–2004); and completed her B.Ed. Honours degree in Education Management with the Cape Peninsula University of Technology (2016). She is the second wife (1992–2010) and widow of the South African author and anti-apartheid activist, Alf Wannenburgh. The couple have one son. While enrolled at Hewat, she joined the Belhar Players in 1995.

Awards 
In 1999, she won a Fleur du Cap Theatre Award for 'Best Supporting Actress' as 'Sophie' in Heinrich Reisenhofer's Suip! (lit. "drink!") and received a First National Bank (FNB) Vita Award nomination for the same role in early 2000. The play and cast also won an additional Fleur du Cap Award for 'Best New Indigenous Script' (1999) that same evening.

Political career 

Matthews participated in the 2021 South African municipal elections as a candidate for Minister Patricia de Lille's Good party and subsequently joined the Cape Town City Council as a proportional representative (PR) municipal councillor (raadslid) on November 9, 2021. She is, therefore, one of the 115 PR members that make up the City Council's total membership of 231 councillors. Between 2005 and 2021, she served as a commissioner for the Western Cape Cultural Commission (WCCC), at the invitation of the then minister Pallo Jordan, and as a board member and adjudicator/advisor on several departmental agencies at provincial and national levels under South Africa's Department of Sport, Arts and Culture.

Original plays/works 
Her own plays, Sandra se Erfenis (first performed by Hewat Drama Group with a student cast at the Grahamstown Festival) — was performed with a student cast at the Grahamstown Festival; and Sonne Skaamte was staged as a 'performed reading' in 2004 at the PlayGround venue at the Baxter Theatre Centre.

Theatre productions 

2018: Tjieng Tjang Tjerries at US Woordfees, Stellenbosch

2017: Die dans van die watermeid (“The dance of the water maiden”) at the Baxter Theatre, Cape Town

2012: Saying Goodbye to Amelia as 'Nora' at the Catalina Theatre

2008: Kroes as 'Aunty Maggie' (presented at the 2008 Suidoosterfees) at Artscape, Cape Town and Oude Libertas Amphitheatre, Stellenbosch

2007: Shirley, Goodness and Mercy at the Baxter Theatre

2006: Truth in Translation (2006) at the Market Theatre and repeated at the Baxter Theatre in 2007 (music composed by Hugh Masekela)

2002: District Six – The Musical as 'Auntie Hester' at the Baxter Theatre (recording released to DVD in 2007)

1999 to 2001: Suip! as 'Sophia' (Aardklop Festival; Perth International Arts Festival [2001] and Octagon Theatre, Crawley, Western Australia [1999?]; Klein Karoo Festival; Baxter Theatre; Grahamstown Festival; Opera House, Port Elizabeth; International Arts Festival, Zanzibar; Knysna Theatre)

199*/200*: Moenie Try Nie at Grahamstown Festival

1998: Mix Masala at Artscape

Filmography

References

External links 
 http://www.imdb.com/name/nm1690230
 https://www.pressreader.com/south-africa/kuier/20220915/page/11

21st-century South African actresses
21st-century South African women politicians
21st-century South African politicians
21st-century South African women writers
20th-century South African women writers
20th-century South African actresses
1961 births
Living people
University of Cape Town alumni
Cape Peninsula University of Technology alumni
Coloured South African people
21st-century South African writers
20th-century South African writers